Ashland is an unincorporated community and census-designated place (CDP) located within Cherry Hill, in Camden County, New Jersey, United States. As of the 2010 United States Census, the CDP's population was 8,302.

Geography
According to the United States Census Bureau, Ashland had a total area of 2.919 square miles (7.561 km2), including 2.914 square miles (7.547 km2) of land and 0.005 square miles (0.014 km2) of water (0.19%).

Demographics

Census 2010

Census 2000
As of the 2000 United States Census there were 8,375 people, 3,115 households, and 2,317 families living in the CDP. The population density was 1,107.4/km2 (2,868.5/mi2). There were 3,209 housing units at an average density of 424.3/km2 (1,099.1/mi2). The racial makeup of the CDP was 87.67% White, 4.41% African American, 0.21% Native American, 6.39% Asian, 0.02% Pacific Islander, 0.59% from other races, and 0.72% from two or more races. Hispanic or Latino of any race were 2.61% of the population.

There were 3,115 households, out of which 31.5% had children under the age of 18 living with them, 62.7% were married couples living together, 8.7% had a female householder with no husband present, and 25.6% were non-families. 21.6% of all households were made up of individuals, and 10.2% had someone living alone who was 65 years of age or older. The average household size was 2.63 and the average family size was 3.10.

In the CDP the population was spread out, with 23.6% under the age of 18, 5.4% from 18 to 24, 28.3% from 25 to 44, 23.9% from 45 to 64, and 18.9% who were 65 years of age or older. The median age was 41 years. For every 100 females, there were 92.4 males. For every 100 females age 18 and over, there were 88.1 males.

The median income for a household in the CDP was $68,063, and the median income for a family was $75,232. Males had a median income of $51,113 versus $37,234 for females. The per capita income for the CDP was $28,936. About 2.8% of families and 4.6% of the population were below the poverty line, including 6.7% of those under age 18 and 3.5% of those age 65 or over.

References

Neighborhoods in Cherry Hill, New Jersey
Census-designated places in Camden County, New Jersey